William Rowe Lyall (11 February 1788 – 17 February 1857) was an English churchman, Dean of Canterbury from 1845 to 1857.

Life

He was born in Stepney, Middlesex, the fifth son of John Lyall and Jane Comyn. He was educated at Trinity College, Cambridge (M.A. 1816). In 1817 he married Catherine Brandreth (1792–1863), daughter of Dr. Brandreth of Liverpool.

Lyall was editor of the British Critic 1816–17 and associated with the Hackney Phalanx, the high-church group. He became editor of the Theological Library (1832–46).  He early recognized a Catholic tendency in John Henry Newman's writing. His appointment as Warburton Lecturer led to a major work, Propædia Prophetica (1840). Lyall's abilities and potential came to the attention of William Howley, the Archbishop of Canterbury, who shaped his career.

Lyall became Archdeacon of Colchester (1824–1842),  Archdeacon of Maidstone (1842–1845), simultaneously Canon of the Ninth Prebend, Canterbury Cathedral (1841–1845), and finally Dean of Canterbury (1845–1857). He died at Canterbury, Kent. There is a monumental tomb in the north aisle of the nave at Canterbury, said to be designed after a model by the sculptor John Birnie Philip (1824–1875), but his remains are in fact buried at the parish church of St Michael in the nearby village of Harbledown, alongside his wife's.

Literary works

He wrote a number of dissertations on religious topics, and was a regular contributor to the Quarterly Review, albeit anonymously. His major published work was Propædia Prophetica (Preparation of Prophesy), in 1840. It was re-published in 1854 and again posthumously in 1885, this time with a preface by his nephew George C. Pearson. He also contributed to the Encyclopædia Metropolitana, an ambitious enterprise to disseminate knowledge: he was invited to write sections of the History Division, in particular: History of Greece, Macedonia and Syria. Co-authors of this work were Jacob Henry Brooke Mountain, George Cecil Renouard and Michael Russell.

Family
His eldest brother was George Lyall, Snr, sometime MP for the City of London (UK Parliament constituency), and Chairman of the East India Company. One of his famous nephews was Alfred Comyn Lyall, the Indian civil servant (1835–1911). Another was James Broadwood Lyall (1838–1916), also an Indian civil servant, who became Governor of the Punjab.

Notes

1788 births
1857 deaths
Deans of Canterbury
Members of the Canterbury Association
Alumni of Trinity College, Cambridge
Lyall family